Lord Parker may refer to:
 Thomas Parker, 1st Earl of Macclesfield (1666–1732), Whig politician, Lord Chief Justice and Lord Chancellor
 Robert Parker, Baron Parker of Waddington (1857–1918), Lord of Appeal in Ordinary
 Hubert Parker, Baron Parker of Waddington (1900–1972), Lord Chief Justice and life peer, son of Robert Parker
 Andrew Parker, Baron Parker of Minsmere (born 1962), Lord Chamberlain, former Director General of MI5